The New South Wales regional leagues are the fifth level of soccer in New South Wales, and the sixth nationally. The league consists of nineteen separate regional senior leagues and is administered by Football New South Wales. The Albury-Wodonga Football Association, which in addition to clubs from southern NSW, includes several clubs based in northern Victoria, is also run by Football NSW.

There is no promotion to NSW State League however clubs may apply to join.

Associations and branches
There are sixteen separate regional metropolitan district associations and three branches (consisting of numerous smaller associations) which operate under the auspices of Football NSW. The metropolitan districts can usually be divided into smaller regions for ease of administration and also for junior state competitions.

Metropolitan East
There are three associations which make up Metropolitan East. They are Canterbury District Soccer Football Association, Eastern Suburbs Football Association and St George Football Association. The structure for the associations are as follows:

Tier-1:
 Bill Brackenbury Cup (Canterbury)
 Championship Firsts/Reserves (Eastern Suburbs)
 Premier League/Reserves (St George)
Tier-2:
 All Age Division 1 & All Age Sunday (Canterbury)
 All Age Division 1 (Eastern Suburbs)
 All Age A/Reserves (St George)
Lower Tiers:
 All Age Divisions 2–14 (Canterbury)
 All Age Divisions 2–9 (Sun) & Division 3, 6, 8 (Sat) (Eastern Suburbs)
 All Ages B–G (St George)

Overage 35's:
 Divisions 1–8 (Canterbury)
 Championship (Eastern Suburbs)
 Divisions B–D (St George)
Overage 45's:
 Divisions 1–3 (Canterbury)
 Championship (Eastern Suburbs, St George)

Women Tier-1:
 Grace Martin Trophy (Canterbury)
 Championship (Eastern Suburbs)
 Premier Women's League (St George)
Women Lower Tiers:
 Divisions 2–4 (Canterbury, Eastern Suburbs)
 Divisions A–C (St George)
Women's Overage:
 Overage 30's Divisions 1 & 2 (Canterbury)
 Eastern Suburbs and St George do not administer any overage women's competitions.

Clubs in the different districts in 2016 are as follows:

Canterbury District Soccer Football Association

The six (6) clubs in bold compete in the Bill Brackenbury Cup in a seven-team competition.
 Abbotsford JSC 
 Ashfield Pirates FC
 Australian National Sports Lakemba
 Balmain DFC
 Belmore Eagles FC
 Burwood FC
 Canterbury JFC
 Concord JFC
 Cooks River Titans FC
 Earlwood Wanderers FC
 Enfield Rovers SC
 FC Five Dock
 Fraser Park FC
 Hurlstone Park Wanderers FC
 Inter Lions SC
 Lakemba Sports Club
 Leichhardt Saints FC
 APIA Leichhardt Tigers FC
 Marrickville FC
 Roselands SC
 Russell Lea Women's SC
 Stanmore Hawks
 Strathfield FC

Eastern Suburbs Football Association
The ten (10) clubs in bold compete in the First Grade Championship.
 Barnstoneworth
 Coogee United
 Dunbar Rovers
 Easts FC
 Glebe Wanderers
 Heffron Hawks
 Kytherians
 Lions FC
 Lokomotiv Cove FC
 Maccabi Hakoah
 Maroubra United 
 Mascot Kings
 South East Eagles FC
 Pagewood-Botany FC
 Phoenix FC
 Queens Park
 Randwick City FC
 Redfern Raiders
 Sydney CBD FC
 Sydney University
 University of NSW FC
 Waverley Old Boys

St George Football Association
The ten (10) clubs in bold compete in the Premier League.

 All Saints Oatley West
 Arncliffe Aurora FC
 Banksia Tigers FC
 Bexley North FC
 Carlton Rovers
 Carss Park FC
 Connells Point FC
 Dolls Point FC
 Forest Rangers FC
 Glory FC
 Hurstville ZFC
 Hurstville City Minotaurs
 Kogarah Waratah
 Lugarno FC
 Oatley RSL
 Peakhurst United
 Penshurst West FC
 Ramsgate RSL FC
 Rockdale Raiders
 Rockdale City Suns FC
 San Souci FC
 Scots FC
 St George Warriors FC

Metropolitan Far North
There are two districts which form the Metropolitan Far North. They are Central Coast Football and Northern Suburbs Football Association. The representative teams are Central Coast Lightning (and now Central Coast Mariners Academy) and Northern Tigers FC respectively. Both teams compete in the National Premier Leagues NSW 2. The structure of the associations are as follows:

Tier-1:
 Premier League/Reserves (Central Coast, Northern Suburbs)
 Thirds (Central Coast only)
Tier-2:
 Division 1/Reserves (Central Coast)
 All Age Division 2/Reserves (Northern Suburbs)
Lower Tiers:
 All Age Divisions 1–10 (Central Coast)
 All Age Divisions 3–6/Reserves (Northern Suburbs)

Overage:
 Over 35's A, B–E North/South (Central Coast)
 Over 35's Firsts/Reserves, Seconds/Reserves, Divisions 3–6 (Northern Suburbs)
 Over 45's Firsts/Reserves, Seconds/Reserves, 2A North/South, 2B North/South, Thirds/Reserves (Northern Suburbs)

Women:
 Division 1–5 (Northern Suburbs)
 Over 35's Divisions 1 & 2 (Northern Suburbs)
 Over 45's Masters (Northern Suburbs)

The member clubs for each association are listed below.

Central Coast Football

The ten (10) clubs in bold compete in Premier League (BPL).

 Avoca FC
 Berkeley Vale SC
 Budgewoi FC
 Doyalson-Wyee SC
 East Gosford FC
 Gosford City FC
 Gwandalan FC
 Kanwal-Warnervale FC
 Kariong United FC
 Killarney District SC
 Kincumber FC
 Mountains District FC

 Ourimbah United FC
 Southern & Ettalong FC
 Terrigal United FC
 The Entrance–Bateau Bay FC
 Toukley-Gorokan SC
 Tuggerah United FC
 Umina United SC
 Woongarrah FC
 Woy Woy FC
 Wyoming FC
 Wyong SC

Northern Suburbs Football Association
The ten (10) clubs in bold compete in the Premier League.

 Asquith
 Bannockburn Rovers
 Berowra FC
 Brooklyn
 Chatswood Rangers
 Corpus Christi
 Gordon
 Greenwhich
 Hornsby Heights
 Hornsby RSL
 Hornsby RSL Youth
 Kissing Point
 Knox United
 Lane Cove
 Lane Cove West
 Lindfield
 Maccabi Northside

 Mongo FC
 Mt Colah
 North Sydney BHS
 North Sydney United
 North Turramurra
 Northbridge FC
 Northern Tigers FC
 Old Barker FC
 Prouille FC
 Sacred Heart Mosman
 Sacred Heart Pymble
 St Ives
 St Michaels
 UTS FC
 Wahroonga FC
 West Pymble
 Willoughby Dalleys FC

Metropolitan Far South
There are two districts which form the Metropolitan Far South. They are Football South Coast and Sutherland Shire Football Association (SSFA). The representative teams for the associations are Wollongong Wolves and Sutherland Sharks. The structure of the associations are as follows:

Tier-1:
 Premier League/Youth (Football South Coast)
 All Age Division 1 (SSFA)
Tier-2:
 District League/Reserves/Youth (Football South Coast)
 All Age Division 2 (SSFA)
Lower Tiers:
 All Age Divisions 1–4 (Football South Coast)
 All Age Divisions 3–16 (SSFA)

Overage:
 Masters Divisions 1–4 (Football South Coast)
 O-35's Divisions A–F (SSFA)
 O-45's Divisions A–D (SSFA)

Women:
 All Age Divisions 1–4 (Football South Coast)
 All Age Divisions A–G (SSFA)
 Overage 30 Divisions A–C (SSFA)

Below are lists of member clubs for each association.

Football South Coast

There are 24 member clubs that compete over two premier tiers in the district. The 12 clubs in bold compete in the Illawarra Mercury Premier League.

 Albion Park White Eagles
 Balgownie Rangers
 Bellambi
 Berkeley Sports
 Bulli FC
 Corrimal Rangers
 Cringila Lions FC
 Fernhill
 Helensburgh Thistle
 Kemblawarra Fury
 Kiama Quarriers
 Oak Flats Falcons

 Picton Rangers
 Port Kembla
 Shell Cove FC
 South Coast United SC
 Tarrawanna Blueys
 Thirroul FC
 UOW FC
 Warilla Wanderers
 Wests Illawarra 
 Wollongong Olympic
 Wollongong United
 Woonona

Sutherland Shire Football Association
The eight (8) clubs in bold compete in Division 1 in a nine-team competition.

 Bangor FC
 Bonnet Bay FC
 Bundeena-Maianbar Breakers
 Barden Ridgebacks FC
 Caringbah Redbacks FC
 Como West-Jannali SC
 Cronulla Seagulls FC
 Cronulla RSL Stingrays FC
 Georges River Tigers
 Engadine Eagles FC
 Engadine Crusaders FC
 Grays Point
 Gwawley Bay FC
 Gymea United FC

 Heathcote Waratah FC
 Kirrawee Kangaroos FC–
 Lilli Pilli FC
 Loftus Yarrawarrah
 Rovers FC
 Marton Hammers FC
 Menai Hawks FC
 Miranda Magpies FC
 North Sutherland Rockets SC
 Sylvania Heights FC
 St. John Bosco YCFC
 St. Patricks Sutherland FC
 Sutherland Titans FC

Metropolitan North
There are three associations which make up Metropolitan North. They are Gladesville Hornsby Football Association (GHFA), Manly Warringah Football Association (MWFA) and North West Sydney Women's Football (NWSWF). The structure for the associations are as follows:

Tier-1:
 Premier League/Seconds (GHFA)
 Premier League/Reserves (MWFA)
Tier-2:
 Super League/Seconds (GHFA)
 All Age Division 1/Reserves (MWFA)
Lower tiers:
 All Age Divisions 1–19 (GHFA)
 All Age Divisions 2–6/Reserves (2–5) (MWFA)

Overage:
 O-35's Divisions 1–7 (GHFA)
 O-45's Divisions 1–4 (GHFA)
 O-35's Divisions 1/1A/1B–8 (MWFA)
 O-45's Divisions 1–2 (MWFA)

Women:
 Premier League/Reserves (MWFA)
 All Age Divisions 1–4 (MWFA)
 Overage O-35's 1–3 (MWFA)

Gladesville Hornsby Football Association
The ten (10) teams in bold compete in the Premier League.
 All Saints Hunters Hill FC
 Ararat FC
 Beecroft FC
 Eastwood St Andrews AFC
 Epping Eastwood FC
 Epping FC
 Gladesville Ravens
 Gladesville Sharks
 Glenhaven FC
 Hills Hawks
 Hills Pumas
 Holy Cross College
 Kenthurst & District FC
 Macquarie Dragons
 Macquarie University
 Normanhurst Eagles
 North Epping Rangers
 North Ryde
 Northern Homenetmen
 Old Ignatians FC
 Pennant Hills FC
 Putney Rangers
 Redbacks FC
 Redfield
 Roselea
 Ryde Panthers
 Ryde Saints United
 St. Patricks FC
 Thornleigh
 West Pennant Hills-Cherrybrook
 West Ryde Eagles
 West Ryde Rovers

Manly Warringah Football Association
The ten (10) clubs in bold compete in the Premier League.
 Avalon 
 Beacon Hill
 Brookvale FC
 BTH Raiders
 Collaroy Cromer Strikers
 Curl Curl Youth
 Dee Why FC
 Forest Killarney
 Harbord Seasiders
 Manly Allambie United
 Manly United
 Manly Vale FC
 Mosman FC 
 Narrabeen FC
 Pittwater RSL
 Seaforth FC
 St Augustines
 Wakehurst FC

North West Sydney Women's Football
 All Saints Hunters Hill
 Beecroft
 Eastwood St Andrews
 Epping
 Flying Bats
 Gladesville Ravens
 Gladesville Sharks
 Hills Hawks
 Kenthurst
 Macquarie Dragons
 Macquarie University
 Mercy College
 Mount St Benedict
 Normanhurst
 North Epping Rangers
 North Ryde
 Pennant Hills
 Putney FC
 Putney Rangers
 Redbacks
 Roselea
 Ryde Panthers
 Ryde Saints United
 St Barnabas
 Sydney Uni
 Thornleigh
 West Pennant Hills Cherrybrook
 West Ryde Rovers

Metropolitan South
There are three associations which make up Metropolitan North. They are Bankstown District Amateur Football Association, Macarthur District Football Association and Southern Districts Football Association (SDFA). The respective representative sides are Bankstown United FC (who compete in the NSW State League), Macarthur Rams (who compete in the National Premier Leagues NSW 2) and Southern Districts Raiders (who also compete in the NSW State League). The structure for the associations are as follows:

Tier-1:
 Platinum League Gold/Green Firsts & Reserves (Bankstown)
 M-League Tier-1 (Macarthur)
 Premier League/Reserves (SDFA)
Tier-2:
 All Age A (Bankstown)
 M-League Tier-2 (Macarthur)
 All Age Division 2 Green/Red (SDFA)
Lower Tiers:
 All Age B–G (Bankstown)
 M-League Tier-3, then All Age Divisions 2–10 (Macarthur)
 All Age Division 3 Green/Red, then Divisions 4–10 (SDFA)

Overage:
 Over 35s Divisions 1–3 & Combined O-35s/O-45s (Bankstown)
 O-35 Divisions 1–3 & O-45 (Macarthur)
 O-35 Split 1–3 & Green/Red (SDFA)

Women:
 All Age Divisions 1–4 (Bankstown)
 All Age Divisions 1–5 (Macarthur)
 All Age Divisions 1–3 (SDFA)

Bankstown District Amateur Football Association
The seventeen (10) clubs compete in the Premier  League .
 Bankstown Dragons FC
 Bankstown Sports Stars FC
 Bankstown Sports Strikers FC
 Bass Hill RSL SC 
 Birrong Sports FC
 Central Sydney Wolves FC
 Condell Park FC
 East Bankstown FC
 Georges River Thistle
 Greenacre Eagles
 Milperra Lions
 North Bankstown SC
 Padstow Hornets FC
 Padstow United SC
 Panania RSL Diggers SC
 Revesby Rovers
 Revesby Workers FC
 Spears Sports Club
 St Christophers FC
 Woodville Wanderers FC
 Yagoona Lions FC

Macarthur District Football Association
The seven (7) clubs in bold compete in McDonalds M-League Tier 1 in and eight-team competition.
 Appin United
 Bradbury-Ambarvale Bears
 Burragorang DSC
 Camden Falcons FC
 Camden Tigers
 Campbelltown Cobras
 Campbelltown Collegians
 Campbelltown Southern Districts
 Campbelltown Uniting Church
 Douglas Park-Wilton FC
 East Campbelltown Hawks
 Eschol Park Wolves
 Fields United
 Gregory Hills FC
 Gunners SC
 Harrington Park SC
 Ingleburn Eagles
 Macarthur Magic
 Minto DSC
 Mt Annan SC
 Narellan Rangers 
 Oran Park Rovers 
 Picton Rangers
 The Ruse FC
 St Mary's Eaglevale SC
 Tahmoor Taipans

Southern Districts Soccer Football Association
The ten (10) clubs compete in the Premier League.
 AC United
 Austral Sports
 Bonnyrigg White Eagles FC
 Bossley Sports
 Bringelly FC
 Canley Heights
 Chipping Norton FC
 Colo Colo FC
 Fairfield Bulls FC
 Fairfield Eagles
 Fairfield Hotspurs
 Fairfield Patrician Brothers
 FC Bossy Liverpool
 FC Bossy Youth
 FC Eagles Sydney
 FC Gazy Auburn
 Freeman Sports
 Hinchinbrook Sports Club
 Horsley Park United
 Kemps Creek
 Leppington Lions
 Liverpool City Robins
 Liverpool Olympic
 Liverpool Rangers
 Liverpool Sports Club
 Liverpool Warriors
 Marconi Juniors
 Moorebank Sports
 Mt. Pritchard FC
 Prairiewood FC
 Smithfield RSL
 South West Wanderers
 Sporting Rovers
 Sydney Juniors FC
 Western Condors
 Wetherill Park
 Wetherill Park Westerners
 White City

Metropolitan West
There are three districts which makeup Metropolitan West, Blacktown & Districts Soccer Football Association, Granville & Districts Soccer Football Association and Nepean Football Association. The representative teams for the associations are Blacktown Spartans, Parramatta FC and Nepean FC respectively. The structure of the associations are as follows: 

Tier-1:
 Premier League/Reserves
 U-20's (Blacktown & Districts only)
Tier-2:
 Super League/Reserves (Granville & Districts only)
 All Age Division 1 (Blacktown & Districts, Nepean)
Tier-3:
 All Age Divisions 2–9 (Blacktown & Districts)
 All Age Divisions 5–10 (Granville & Districts)
 All Age Divisions 3–14 (Nepean)

Overage-35's:
 Blacktown Divisions 1–6
 Granville Divisions 1–5
 Nepean Divisions 1–5 and Friday Night
Overage-45's:
 Blacktown Division 1 
 Granville Division 1
 Nepean does not provide this competition

Women:
 All Age Divisions 1–4 (Blacktown & Districts)
 Ladies Premier League, All Age Divisions 1–3, Overage-35's (Granville & Districts)
 All Age Divisions 1–6 (Nepean)

Below are lists of member clubs for each association.

Blacktown & Districts Soccer Football Association
The 12 clubs in bold participate in Premier League.
 Doonside Hawks
 Eastern Creek
 Glenwood Redbacks
 Kings Langley
 Lourdes Soccer
 Marayong
 Minchinbury Jets
 Newbury Bulls
 Oakville United Ravens
 Parklea SC
 Plumpton-Oakhurst
 Polonia FC
 Ponds FC
 Premier Spurs
 Prospect United
 Quakers Hill
 Quakers Hill Tigers
 Riverstone-Schofields
 Rooty Hill RSL (YTB)
 Ropes Crossing FC
 St Patricks
 Town Rangers
 Blacktown Workers FC

Granville & Districts Soccer Football Association
The 12 clubs in bold compete in the Premier League in a 13-team competition.
 Auburn District
 Auburn FC
 Dundas United
 Ermington United
 Granville Kewpie Ariana
 Granville Rage
 Granville Waratahs
 Greystanes
 Guildford County
 Guildford McCredie
 Holroyd Rangers
 Kellyville
 Lidcombe Churches
 Lidcombe Waratah
 Merrylands SFC
 Newington
 Parramatta City
 Pendle Hill
 Regents Park
 Rouse Hill
 Rydalmere
 Sydney Dragon FC
 Toongabbie
 Wentworthville Uniting Church
 Wenty Waratah
 Winston Hills

Nepean Football Association
The eight (8) clubs in bold compete in the Premier League.
 Blaxland FC
 Bligh Park FC
 Blue Mountains FC
 Blue Mountains Grammar School SC
 Colo SFC
 Cranebrook United SC
 Emu Plains FC
 Glenmore Park FC
 Glossodia FC
 Hazelbrook FC
 Henry Lawson FC
 Jamisontown FC
 Joeys SC
 Lowland Wanderers SC
 Mulgoa Valley FC
 Nepean Dragons
 Penrith FC
 Penrith RSL SC
 Penrith Rovers FC
 Pitt Town Sports SC
 Richmond Ex-Servicemen's SC
 Springwood United FC
 St Paul's Grammar School
 St Clair United SC
 St Marys Band Club Rangers FC
 St Marys Convent SC
 St Marys SC
 Warradale FC
 Wentworth Falls FC
 Werrington FC
 Wilberforce United SC
 Wollemi FC

Riverina Branch

Albury-Wodonga Football Association
The twelve (12) clubs in bold compete in Division 1 competition.
 Albury City SC
 Albury Hotspurs
 Albury United
 Boomers FC
 Melrose FC
 Myrtleford Savoy SC
 St. Pats FC
 Twin City Wanderers
 Wangaratta City FC
 Wodonga Diamonds
 Wodonga Heart
 Cobram Roar

Griffith District Football Association
The six (6) clubs in bold compete in First Grade.
 Griffith City FC
 Leeton United FC
 West Griffith SC
 Yenda FC
 Yoogali FC
 Yoogali SC
 Deniliquin Wanderers

South West Slopes
 Cootamundra JSC
 Gundagai Panthers
 Harden SC
 Temora SC
 Tumut Eagles FC

Football Wagga Wagga
The ten (10) clubs in bold compete in First Grade (Pascoe Cup).
 Cootamundra SC
 Hanwood FC
 Henwood Park FC
 Junee SC
 Lake Albert SC
 Northern Riverina Nomads
 South Wagga Sports
 Temora SC
 Tolland FC
 Tumut Eagles FC
 Wagga United
 Young Lions

Southern Branch
Clubs in the different districts in 2016 are as follows:

Eurobodalla Football Association
 Batemans Bay FC
 Bodalla SC
 Broulee FC
 Clyde United SC
 Moruya FC
 Narooma SC

Shoalhaven District Football Association
 Bomaderry FC
 Callala FC
 Culburra FC
 Gerringong FC
 Huskisson Vincentia FC
 Illaroo FC
 Manyana FC
 Milton Ulladulla FC
 Shoalhaven Heads Berry FC
 St Georges Basin FC
 Sussex Inlet FC
 Wreck Bay FC

Highlands Soccer Association
The five (5) teams in bold make up the current first grade All Age Men competition.
 Bowral United FC
 Bundanoon Rebels FC
 Chevalier College Soccer
 Exeter SC
 Gib Gate School Soccer
 Hill Top Kookaburras SC
 Mittagong United Lions
 Moss Vale Thistle SC
 Oxley College Soccer
 Robertson-Burrawang Rovers SC
 Tudor House School
 Yerrinbool-Bargo Bushrangers SC

Southern Tablelands
The five (5) clubs in bold compete in the eight-team All Age Men's competition.
 Braidwood JSC
 Crookwell SC 
 Goulburn Stags FC
 Goulburn Workers FC
 Marulan FC
 MBK United SC
 Ss Peter & Paul FC
 Trinity FC
 Wollondilly Soldiers SC

Far South Coast Football Association
 Bega Devils SC
 Bemboka SC
 Eden Killer Whales
 Mallacooota SC
 Merimbula SC
 Pambula United
 Tathra United
 Wolumla FC

Western Branch
There are six associations that form the Western Branch. They are the Bathurst District Football Association, Dubbo & District Football Association, Lachlan Association, Lithgow Association, Orange Association and Western Plains Association. Each association is eligible to send representative team/(s) to the Western NSW Youth League. The branch association representative team is Western NSW Mariners, who compete in National Premier Leagues NSW 3. The structure of the associations are as follows:

Men's:
 1st–3rd Grade, then combined 4th/5th that splits into two mid-season (Bathurst)
 1st–2nd Grade, then All Age 1–2 (Dubbo)
 Divisions 1–3 (Lachlan)
 Men's League (Lithgow)

Women's:
 Combined All Age, then splits into Divisions 1–2 mid-season (Dubbo)
 Women's League (Lithgow)

Bathurst District Football

 Abercrombie 
 Bathurst '75
 Bathurst Athletic
 Bathurst City Red Tops
 CSU Bathurst
 Churches United
 Collegians
 Eglinton DFC
 Kinross Wolaroi
 Lithgow City Rangers
 Lithgow Thistles
 Lithgow Workmen's Club
 Macquarie United
 Millthorpe Tigers
 Mudgee Wolves
 Oberon United Wolves
 Panda FC
 Panorama FC
 Scots All Saints College

Dubbo & District Football Association

Coonamble
Dubbo City Rangers
Dubbo FC Bulls
East Dubbo United
Macquarie United
Narromine
Newtown
North West Falcons FC
Orana Spurs
RSL 78's
RSL Youth
SASS
South Dubbo Wanderers
Walgett
Wellington Warriors
Westside Panthers

Lachlan Amateur Soccer Association
There are 13 clubs affiliated with Lachlan Association. The five (5) teams in bold compete in 1st Division in a six-team competition.
 Billabong SC
 Boorowra SC
 Cambridge Saints
 Condobolin Crusaders
 Cowra DSC
 Forbes DSC
 Grenfell SC
 Parkes Railway Hotel Chooks
 Parkes Rovers SC
 Raptors SC
 Star Jets
 Tichborne Tigers
 Young Lions SC

Lithgow Association
There are five (5) affiliated clubs. The three (3) clubs in bold compete in the Men's League.
 Workies Redbacks FC
 Lithgow Thistles FC
 Wellarawang SC
 Blackheath Soccer FC
 Lithgow City Rangers

Orange & District Football Association
There are 13 affiliated clubs. 
 Barnstoneworth
 Blayney (Juniors)
 Canobolas Rangers (Juniors)
 Cudal
 CYMS
 East Orange
 Ex-Services
 Kinross
 Millthorpe
 Molong
 Orange Anglican Grammar
 The Saints
 Waratahs

Western Plains Association
There are seven (7) affiliated clubs.
 Bourke
 Cobar
 Gilgandra
 Nyngan
 Tottenham FC
 Trangie
 Warren

Sydney Amateur League
 Randwick City FC
 Western City Lions FC
 Leichhardt Saints SFC
 Dobroyd FC
 Glebe Gorillas
 Golden Stars FC
 MRPFC
 FC Danphe
 Sydney Jets FC

Unaffiliated

Sydney Hills Football Association
There is also a breakaway competition currently unaffiliated with Football New South Wales, the Sydney Hills Football Association (SHFA). The association was born out of clubs previously competing in the Granville Districts and Gladesville Hornsby associations. It was incorporated on 15 December 2014 and commenced its inaugural competition in the winter season of 2016. The structure is as follows:
Men's: Premier League/Reserves, All Age Divisions 1–6
Men's Overage: O-35's Divisions 1–3, O45's.
Youth (Boys): Youth Divisions 1–2, Ages 6–18. 
Women's: Premier League, All Age 2 (Senior).  
Women's Overage: 35L Divisions 1–2 (Overage).
Youth (Girls): Youth, Ages 9–15 (Underage).

There are fifteen (15) clubs member clubs of the SHFA:
 Baulkham Hills FC
 Castle Hill RSL Rockets 
 Castle Hill United 
 Coptic United
 The Hills Grammar School 
 North Rocks SC 
 Norwest FC 
 Hills Knights 
 Kellyville United 
 Maroota FC
 Northwest FC 
 Rouse Hill Rangers 
 St Bernadettes FC

The seven clubs in bold compete in the Premier League. Both Baulkham Hills and Kellyville United field two teams (Red and Blue) in this league.

Notes

References

External links 
 Football NSW

Soccer in New South Wales
Australia